Thondimuthalum Driksakshiyum is a 2017 Indian Malayalam-language thriller-drama film directed by Dileesh Pothan. The film stars Fahadh Faasil, Suraj Venjaramoodu,Nimisha Sajayan, Alencier Ley Lopez, Vettukili Prakash, and Sibi Thomas. It was written by Sajeev Pazhoor along with Syam Pushkaran who was also creative director. Bijibal composed the music while Rajeev Ravi handled the cinematography. 

Produced on a budget of 65 million, Thondimuthalum Driksakshiyum was released on 30 June 2017 and grossed 175 million in Kerala. The film was cited as one of the "Top 5 Malayalam movies in 2017" and "The 25 best Malayalam films of the decade" by The Hindu. The film garnered awards and nominations in several categories, with particular praise for its direction, screenplay and Fahadh's performance. The film won 36 awards from 45 nominations.

Awards and nominations

See also 
 List of Malayalam films of 2017

Notes

References

External links
 Accolades for Thondimuthalum Driksakshiyum at the Internet Movie Database

Lists of accolades by Indian film